Matteo Pisseri (born 21 November 1991) is an Italian footballer who plays for  side Monopoli on loan from Triestina.

Career
Pisseri started his career at Parma, the club he has supported since his childhood. He was one of the keepers of the Primavera (youth team) from 2008 to 2011, as backup of Andrea Gasparri, Stefano Russo and Daniele Agosti respectively. Pisseri graduated from the youth system in 2011 and left for Renate on 7 July 2011 in a co-ownership deal. He made 33 appearances for the Lega Pro Seconda Divisione side and was rated the first among youngsters of Lega Pro (players born in 1990 or after) by La Gazzetta dello Sport.

In early June 2012, Parma chose to buy back the 50% share that they had sold a year ago.

On 15 July 2012, he was signed by another fourth division club Catanzaro in temporary deal.

On 9 August 2019, he signed with Pistoiese.

On 19 August 2020, he joined Alessandria.

On 29 August 2022, Pisseri signed a two-year contract with Triestina. On 31 January 2023, Pisseri returned to Monopoli on loan.

References

1991 births
Sportspeople from Parma
Footballers from Emilia-Romagna
Living people
Italian footballers
Association football defenders
A.C. Renate players
Parma Calcio 1913 players
U.S. Catanzaro 1929 players
A.S. Gubbio 1910 players
S.S. Juve Stabia players
Ternana Calcio players
S.S. Monopoli 1966 players
Catania S.S.D. players
U.S. Pistoiese 1921 players
U.S. Alessandria Calcio 1912 players
U.S. Triestina Calcio 1918 players
Serie C players
Serie B players